Senneleys Park is a public park located in Bartley Green, Birmingham, containing large open spaces, hedgerows and a tree-lined stream.

Attractions include football pitches, a skate park, an outdoor playground, a BMX track, an outdoor gym and picnic tables.

References

Parks and open spaces in Birmingham, West Midlands